Hoyes is an unincorporated community in Garrett County, Maryland, United States.

References

Unincorporated communities in Garrett County, Maryland
Unincorporated communities in Maryland